Germaria angustata is a species of tachinid flies in the genus Germaria of the family Tachinidae.

Distribution
United Kingdom, Denmark, Netherlands, Germany, Hungary, Russia, Mongolia, China.

References

Diptera of Europe
Diptera of Asia
Tachininae
Insects described in 1844
Taxa named by Johan Wilhelm Zetterstedt